In diatonic set theory, a generated collection is a collection or scale formed by repeatedly adding a constant interval in integer notation, the generator, also known as an interval cycle, around the chromatic circle until a complete collection or scale is formed. All scales with the deep scale property can be generated by any interval coprime with (in twelve-tone equal temperament) twelve. (Johnson, 2003, p. 83)

The C major diatonic collection can be generated by adding a cycle of perfect fifths (C7) starting at F: F-C-G-D-A-E-B = C-D-E-F-G-A-B. Using integer notation and modulo 12: 5 + 7 = 0, 0 + 7 = 7, 7 + 7 = 2, 2 + 7 = 9, 9 + 7 = 4, 4 + 7 = 11.

The C major scale could also be generated using cycle of perfect fourths (C5), as 12 minus any coprime of twelve is also coprime with twelve: 12 − 7 = 5. B-E-A-D-G-C-F.

A generated collection for which a single generic interval corresponds to the single generator or interval cycle used is a MOS (for "moment of symmetry") or well formed generated collection. For example, the diatonic collection is well formed, for the perfect fifth (the generic interval 4) corresponds to the generator 7. Though not all fifths in the diatonic collection are perfect (B-F is a diminished fifth, tritone, or 6), a well formed generated collection has only one specific interval between scale members (in this case 6)—which corresponds to the generic interval (4, a fifth) but to not the generator (7). The major and minor pentatonic scales are also well formed. (Johnson, 2003, p. 83)

The properties of generated and well-formedness were described by Norman Carey and David Clampitt in "Aspects of Well-Formed Scales" (1989), (Johnson, 2003, p. 151.) In earlier (1975) work, theoretician Erv Wilson defined the properties of the idea, and called such a scale a MOS, an acronym for "Moment of Symmetry". While unpublished until it appeared online in 1999, this paper was widely distributed and well known throughout the microtonal music which adopted the term. the paper also remains more inclusive of further developments of the concept. 
For instance, the three-gap theorem implies that every generated collection has at most three different steps, the intervals between adjacent tones in the collection (Carey 2007).

A degenerate well-formed collection is a scale in which the generator and the interval required to complete the circle or return to the initial note are equivalent and include all scales with equal notes, such as the whole-tone scale. (Johnson, 2003, p. 158, n. 14)

A bisector is a more general concept used to create collections that cannot be generated but includes all collections which can be generated.

See also
833 cents scale
Cyclic group
Distance model
Pythagorean tuning

References

Sources

Carey, Norman and Clampitt, David (1989). "Aspects of Well-Formed Scales", Music Theory Spectrum 11: 187–206.
Clough, Engebretsen, and Kochavi. "Scales, Sets, and Interval Cycles", 79.
Johnson, Timothy (2003). Foundations of Diatonic Theory: A Mathematically Based Approach to Music Fundamentals. Key College Publishing. .

External links
 Original concept of MOS as presented in a 1975 letter by Erv Wilson

Diatonic set theory